The Edvard Prize is a Norwegian music award in given by TONO, copyright organization for musicians and composers. The honor, which was given for the first time in 1998, is given each year and is only given to organization members. The goal is to enhance the musical life and increase awareness of Norwegian composers and writers and their works. The prize is named after the Norwegian composer Edvard Grieg.

Number of prize levels have varied since the start. As of 2007 Edvard Prize presents prizes in 4 categories:
 Contemporary
 Popular
 Open class
 Lyrics

The winner in each category receives NKR 50 000,- and the EDVARD trophy (design: Bruno Oldani) and a diploma. The award is a continuation of the price Work of the Year, which was awarded from 1965 to 1996.

Winners

1998

1999

2000

2001

2002

2003

2004

2005

2006

2007

2008 

It was not awarded a prize for 2009.

2010

2011

2012

2013

2014

2015

2016

2017

References

External links 
 The TONO official website

Norwegian music awards
Awards established in 1998